Pirker is a surname. Notable people with the surname include:

 Hubert Pirker (born 1948), Austrian politician and Member of the European Parliament
 Johanna Pirker (born 1988), Austrian computer scientist
 Pero Pirker (1927–1972), Croatian and Yugoslav politician
 Thomas Pirker (born 1987), Austrian footballer

See also
 Parker (surname)